Eugène Langenove (born 1898) was a French footballer who played as a defender. He became the first Frenchman to play league football in England when he signed for Walsall in 1922. He participated in the Coupe de France Final 1921 with Olympique de Paris. Georges Crozier, who played for Fulham in the Southern League between 1904 and 1906, was the first Frenchman to play in England.

References

External links
 
 

1898 births
Year of death missing
Association football defenders
French footballers
France international footballers
Le Havre AC players
Walsall F.C. players
Red Star F.C. players